Albert Hawkins (15 October 1883 – 19 December 1961) was a British wrestler. He competed in the men's Greco-Roman lightweight at the 1908 Summer Olympics.

References

External links
 

1883 births
1961 deaths
British male sport wrestlers
Olympic wrestlers of Great Britain
Wrestlers at the 1908 Summer Olympics
Place of birth missing